The Belarusian State Academy of Arts (Belarusian: Беларуская дзяржаўная акадэмія мастацтваў Russian: Белорусская государственная академия искусств) is a state-owned institution of higher education in Minsk, Belarus. The Belarusian State Academy of Arts has status as a leading institution of the national system of art and cultural education alongside the Belarusian State Academy of Music and the Belarusian State University of Culture and Arts.

It was established in 1945 as the Belarus Theatrical institute. Art faculty was established in 1953, and renamed into the "Belarusian State Academy of Arts" in 2001.

Rectors
 Vasyl Sharangovich (1989—1997)
 Richard Smolsky (1997—2010)
 Mikhail Borozna (2010—present)

Faculty and Curriculum
Theatrical
Design
Easel painting
Monumental and Decorative painting
Graphics and printmaking
Sculpture
Cinema and TV direction

Notable alumni
Palina, Belarusian singer.
Zianon Pazniak, Belarusan nationalist politician, art critic, historian.
 Boris Zaborov, Contemporary painter, living in France.
 Alexandr Rodin, Contemporary painter, living in Germany.
 Viktar Kopach, Contemporary sculptor, living in Belarus.
 Viktar Dashkevich, Actor.

Notable faculty and staff
Mai Dantsig, National artist of USSR / Dean, Art faculty
Ninel Aladova, architect, professor, head of the department "Interior and Equipment"

Political repressions, sanctions
On 21 June 2021, Mikhail Borozna (Barazna), Rector of the Belarusian State Academy of Arts, was added to the sanctions list of the European Union. According to the official decision of the EU, "in his position as the Rector of the Belarusian State Academy of Arts (BSAA), Mikhail Barazna is responsible for the decision of University administration to expel students for taking part in peaceful protests. The expulsion orders were taken following Lukashenka's call on 27 October 2020 for expelling from universities students taking part in protests and strikes. Mikhail Barazna is therefore responsible for the repression of civil society and is supporting the Lukashenka regime."

References

External links
 Official website of the Belarusian State Academy of Arts
 Info Page

Educational institutions established in 1945
Belarusian State Academy of Arts
1945 establishments in the Soviet Union